Saskatoon Riversdale is a provincial electoral district for the Legislative Assembly of Saskatchewan, Canada. It was held by two Premiers of Saskatchewan from 1991 to 2007 – Roy Romanow and Lorne Calvert. It is currently represented by Marv Friesen of the Saskatchewan Party.

The constituency was one of five created for the city of Saskatoon when the former multi-member constituency of Saskatoon City was abolished prior to the 1967 general election. Of those five ridings, Saskatoon Riversdale is the only one to have existed continuously without renaming.

It contains Riversdale, a subdivision of the Core Neighbourhoods Suburban Development Area in Saskatoon.

The riding has historically been an NDP stronghold, although it was won by the Saskatchewan Party in the 2020 provincial election. It had been in NDP hands for all but one term of its existence.

Members of the Legislative Assembly

Election history
2020 general election

 

 

2016 general election

 

 

2011 general election

2009 by-election
|

|NDP
|Danielle Chartier
|align="right"|2,154
|align="right"|53.02
|align="right"|-3.09

|}

2007 general election

References

External links 
 Website of the Legislative Assembly of Saskatchewan
 Map of Saskatoon Riverside riding as of 2016

Saskatchewan provincial electoral districts
Politics of Saskatoon